Felipe Claro Santa’Ana Silva (born February 28, 1986) is a Brazilian rugby sevens player. He was named in 's sevens squad for the 2016 Summer Olympics. He was named in the ian squad that played in a two-match test series against  in 2015.

References

External links 
 
 

1986 births
Living people
Male rugby sevens players
Brazilian rugby union players
Olympic rugby sevens players of Brazil
Brazil international rugby sevens players
Rugby sevens players at the 2016 Summer Olympics
Brazilian rugby sevens players
Brazil international rugby union players